The sixth season of Romanian television music competition X Factor—based on The X Factor series—started airing on September 9, 2016 on Romanian broadcaster Antena 1. Răzvan Simion and Dani Oțil are the hosts as in the previous five seasons, with Delia Matache, Horia Brenciu and Ștefan Bănică, Jr. returning to the judging panel with the addition of Carla's Dreams as the fourth judge. 

Olga Verbiţchi won the competition and Carla's Dreams became the winning mentor.

Judges

 Delia Matache

Delia Matache is a famous Romanian eurobeat singer-songwriter, TV celebrity, dancer, philanthropist, former model, fashion designer. She has started her stage music activity in 1999 in N&D music band with Nicolae Marin and had released 4 albums, and after the split off in 2003 she had released another two solo albums.

 Horia Brenciu

Horia Brenciu is a Romanian singer, television host for the Romanian version of Dancing with the Stars, successful entertainer, and philanthropist. He studied at National College Andrei Şaguna from Braşov, then he continued to Şcoala Populară de Artă Braşov, at piano and canto class, and in 1998 he finished The Theater Academy in Bucharest.

 Ștefan Bănică, Jr.

Ștefan Bănică, Jr. is a Romanian entertainer, of roma people origin from his father side, TV presenter, one of the most important Romanian TV personality, the son of actor Ștefan Bănică.  He is well known in Romanian for presenting the Romania version of “Dancing with the Stars”, the most longevive dance competition ever aired in Romania, broadcast on Pro TV.

 Carla's Dreams

Carla's Dreams is a Moldavian musical project which was started by Dobra Robertin 2012. The band is an anonymous group of singers and composers who sing in Romanian, Russian and English. During concerts, the band's vocalist, to hide his identity, wears hood and sunglasses, and his face is masked.

Established in Chișinău, Carla's Dreams combines several musical styles, including hip hop, jazz, rock and pop. The first song produced by Carla's Dreams was Dă-te ("Get Off"). Carla's Dreams has launched in Romania in 2013, along with Inna with the song P.O.H.U.I., later to sing with Loredana Lumea ta ("Your World"), and in 2015 with Delia, releasing songs Cum ne noi ("How We Us") and Da, mamă ("Yes, Mother").

Auditions

Audition process was based on the British and American version. First up were "The Producer's Audition", where the producers chose singers to proceed to the second phase which was "The Audition before the Judging panel".

The auditions were broadcast from 9 September 2016 until 11 November 2016. The auditions consisted in 11 episodes.

Bootcamp
This season, there will be four categories : Boys (14-24 years), Girls (14-24 years), Over 24s and Groups. The judges selected themselves which category they will mentor this season.

Brenciu will mentor the Over 24s, Bănică the Groups, Carla's Dream the Girls and Matache will mentor the Boys.

Complete Teams
Color key
 – Eliminated in Four-chair challenge
 – Eliminated in Duels
 – Finalist
 – Wildcard

Four-chair challenge
This season, the categories will face the four-chair challenge. From the 40 acts competing, at the end of this round, only 16 acts will go further in the competition. Also this year there will be a "Golden Chair" where a mentor can send an act directly in the live shows.

The Four-Chair Challenge was broadcast between November 18 and November 30 and consisted in 4 episodes.

Color key
 – Contestant was immediately eliminated after performance without switch
 – Contestant was switched out later in the competition and eventually eliminated
 – Contestant was not switched out and made the final four of their own category

Duels
At the end of this round there will be 8 acts remaining, two for each category.

The two winners for each mentor will advance to the Live shows.

Colour key:

 - Artist won the Duel and advanced to the Live shows

 - Artist lost the Duel and was eliminated

Wildcard
In this season, like Season 5, the public will have the chance to save one of the acts that competed in the Auditions. The most voted act will go directly to the Live Shows. In the first live show if one of the mentor decides to take him in his team, then he will go further in the competition, otherwise he will be sent home.

The winner of this season was Alex Mladin from the Boys Category.

Finalists
The nine finalists will compete in the Live Shows.

 – Winner
 – Runner-up
 – Third place

Live shows

Results summary
Color key

Live show details

Live Show 1 - December 9, 2016
 Theme: Romanian Gala 
 Group performance: Medley ("Da-mi noptile inapoi", "Sa te gandesti la mine", "Focul", "Vreau o minune") 
 Musical guests: Horia Brenciu ("Langa tine", "Fac ce-mi spune inima"), Carla's Dreams ("Sub pielea mea", "Ne bucuram in ciuda lor")

Live Show 2: Semifinal - December 16, 2016

Live Show 3: Final - December 23, 2016

Round 1
 Theme: Duet with special guest and with their mentor

Round 2
 Theme: Final

Ratings

References

X Factor (Romanian TV series)
Romania 06
2016 Romanian television seasons
Antena 1 (Romania) original programming